Evins is a surname. Notable people with the surname include:

John H. Evins (1830–1884), American politician, U.S. Representative from South Carolina 
Joe L. Evins (1910–1984), American politician, Democratic U.S. Representative from Tennessee from 1947 to 1977
Dan Evins (1935–2012), American entrepreneur and founder of Cracker Barrel Old Country Store

See also
Edgar Evins State Park in DeKalb County, Tennessee
Evin (disambiguation)
Evans (disambiguation)